These are some of the notable events relating to politics in 1995.

Events

January
January 1- André Degroeve becomes Governor of Brussels-Capital.
January 1- Fernando Henrique Cardoso becomes President of Brazil.
January 1- Orleir Messias Cameli becomes Governor of Acre.
January 1- Divaldo Suruagy becomes Governor of Alagoas.
January 1- João Alberto Rodrigues Capiberibe becomes Governor of Amapá.
January 1- Amazonino Armando Mendes becomes Governor of Amazonas.
January 1- Paulo Ganem Souto becomes Governor of Bahia.
January 1- Tasso Ribeiro Jereissati becomes Governor of Ceará.
January 1- Cristovam Buarque becomes Governor of Distrito Federal.
January 1- Victor Buaiz becomes Governor of Espírito Santo
January 1- Luiz Alberto Maguito Vilela becomes Governor of Goiás.
January 1- Roseana Macieira Sarney Murad becomes Governor of Maranhão.
January 1- Dante Martins de Oliveira becomes Governor of Mato Grosso.
January 1- Wilson Barbosa Martins becomes Governor of Mato Grosso do Sul.
January 1- Eduardo Brandão de Azeredo becomes Governor of Minas Gerais.
January 1- Almir José de Oliveira Gabriel becomes Governor of Pará.
January 1- Antonio Marques da Silva Mariz becomes Governor of Paraíba.
January 1- Jaime Lerner becomes Governor of Paraná.
January 1- Miguel Arraes de Alencar becomes Governor of Pernambuco.
January 1- Francisco de Assis de Moraes Souza becomes Governor of Piauí.
January 1- Marcello Nunes de Alencar becomes Governor of Rio de Janeiro
January 1- Garibaldi Alves Filho becomes Governor of Rio Grande do Norte.
January 1- Antônio Britto Filho becomes Governor of Rio Grande do Sul.
January 1- Valdir Raupp de Mattos becomes Governor of Rondônia.
January 1- Neudo Ribeiro Campos becomes Governor of Roraima.
January 1- Paulo Afonso Evangelista Vieira becomes Governor of Santa Catarina.
January 1- Mário Covas Júnior becomes Governor of São Paulo.
January 1- Albano do Prado Pimentel Franco becomes Governor Sergipe.
January 1- José Wilson Siqueira Campos becomes Governor of Tocantins.
January 1- Dianne L. Haskett becomes Mayor of London, Ontario.
January 3- Sir Orville Alton Turnquest becomes Governor General of the Bahamas.
January 6- Pierre Dartout becomes Prefect of French Guiana.
January 16- Helen Maksagak becomes Commissioner of the Northwest Territories.
January 25- Zhan Videnov becomes Premier of Bulgaria.

February
February 1- Martin Mowbray becomes Governor of the Cocos Islands.
February 8- Roméo LeBlanc becomes Governor General of Canada.
February 22- Antoine Nduwayo becomes Prime Minister of Burundi.

March
March 2- Josef Pühringer becomes Premier of Oberösterreich.
March 9- Kate Carnell becomes Chief Administrator of Australian Capital Territory.

April
April 4- Bob Carr becomes Premier of New South Wales.
April 12- Gabriel Koyambounou becomes Governor of the Central African Republic.
April 8- Koibla Djimasta becomes Prime Minister of Chad.
April 13- Paavo Lipponen becomes Prime Minister of Finland.
April 17- Tiit Vähi becomes Prime Minister of Estonia.
April 21- Garde Gardom becomes Lieutenant Governor of British Columbia.
April 29- Caabi El-Yachroutu Mohamed becomes Prime Minister of Comoros.

May
May 1- Jacques Chirac becomes President of France.
May 15- Ralph O'Neal becomes Chief Minister of the British Virgin Islands.
May 18- Alain Juppé becomes Prime Minister of France.
May 26- Shane Stone becomes Chief Minister of Northern Territory.

June
June 12- Judy Gingell becomes Commissioner of the Yukon Territory.
June 14- Edison James becomes Prime Minister of Dominica.
June 15-June 17 - 21st G7 summit takes place in Halifax, Nova Scotia, Canada.
June 18- Wang Yunkun becomes acting Governor of Jilin.
June 26- Mike Harris becomes Premier of Ontario.

July
July 6- Carlos Arturo Juárez becomes Governor of Santiago del Estero.
July 8- Eduardo Bauzá becomes Cabinet Chief of Argentina.
July 12- Ramón Mestre becomes Governor of Córdoba.
July 27- Milan Babić becomes Prime Minister of the Republic of Serbian Krajina.

August
August 22- Negasso Gidada becomes President of Ethiopia.
August 23- Meles Zenawi becomes Prime Minister of Ethiopia.
August 30- Gilbert Clements becomes Lieutenant Governor of Prince Edward Island.

September
September 18- José Targino Maranhão becomes Governor of Paraíba.
September 29- Ayoubo Combo becomes Coordinator of the Transitional Military Committee of Comoros.

October
October 2- Sir Guy Green becomes Governor of Tasmania.
October 2- Mohamed Taki Abdoulkarim becomes President of Comoros, and Said Ali Kemal becomes acting President of Comoros.
October 5- Caamby El-Yachourtu becomes interim President of Comoros.
October 16- Rajko Kasagic becomes Prime Minister of Republika Srpska.
October 16- John Wynne Owen becomes Governor of the Cayman Islands.
October 29- Antonio Domingo Bussi becomes Governor of Tucumán.

November
November 3- Alan Hoole becomes Governor of Anguilla.
November 4- Zlatko Mateša becomes Prime Minister of Croatia.
November 22- Don Morin becomes Premier of the Northwest Territories.
November 24- Roger Jansson becomes Chief Minister of Åland.

December
December 9- Ángel Maza becomes Governor of La Rioja.
December 9- Pablo Verani becomes Governor of Río Negro
December 10- Ángel Rozas becomes Governor of Chaco.
December 10- Jorge Busti becomes Governor of Entre Ríos.
December 10- Guillermo Snopek becomes Governor of the Jujuy Province.
December 10- Felipe Sapag becomes Governor of Neuquén.
December 10- Juan Carlos Romero becomes Governor of Salta.
December 11- Gildo Insfrán becomes Governor of Formosa.
December 11- Arturo Lafalla becomes Governor of Mendoza.
December 11- Jorge Obeid becomes Governor of Santa Fe Province.
December 14- Carl Bildt of Sweden becomes the International High Representative of Bosnia and Herzegovina.
December 19- Sir Denys Williams becomes acting Governor General of Barbados.
December 31- Ahmed Ouyahia becomes Prime Minister of Algeria.

References 

 
Politics by year
20th century in politics
1990s in politics